The 80th Assembly District of Wisconsin is one of 99 districts in the Wisconsin State Assembly.  Located in south-central Wisconsin, the district comprises most of southwest Dane County and parts of the northwest Green County and southeast Iowa County.  It includes the city of Verona and the southern half of the city of Fitchburg, as well as the villages of Belleville, Hollandale, Mount Horeb, and New Glarus.  The district is represented by Democrat Mike Bare, since January 2023.

The 80th Assembly District is located within Wisconsin's 27th Senate district, along with the 79th and 81st Assembly districts.

List of past representatives

References 

Wisconsin State Assembly districts
Dane County, Wisconsin
Green County, Wisconsin
Iowa County, Wisconsin